Shinjuku Expressway Bus Terminal or Busta Shinjuku (バスタ新宿) is a major bus terminal located at Shinjuku Station South. It is Japan's largest and first integrated bus terminal in Greater Tokyo serving once scattered companies.

External links 
 Shinjuku Expressway Bus Terminal

Bus stations in Tokyo
Transport infrastructure completed in 2016
2016 establishments in Japan
Buildings and structures in Shinjuku